La Trayectoria may refer to:

 La Trayectoria (Luny Tunes album), 2005
 La Trayectoria (Gloria Trevi album), 2006

See also
 Mi Trayectoria, an album by Don Chezina
 Mi Trayectoria, an album by Héctor el Father